Kshetrimayum Rashi (full name: Kshetrimayum Ningol Lairellakpam Ongbi Rashi, born March 1950) is an Indian actress from Imphal, Manipur, who worked in theatre and Manipuri films. She was introduced into the world of theatre by her mother Rasamani Devi. She is best known for her role in the movie Imagi Ningthem, which also received wide international acclaim. Rashi has featured in over 150 radio plays. She was conferred with the Lifetime Achievement Award at the 13th Manipur State Film Awards 2020. She is also the recipient of the Sahitya Seva Samiti, Kakching Neta Irawat Leelaroi Lifetime Achievement Award in 2014.

Career
Rashi got to know about acting and theatre from her mother. Her first play was Jadonang (staged in September 1969), where she played the role of Rani Gaidinliu in Aryan Theatre, Imphal. Gaidinliu saw the play and praised Rashi's performance. Her first silver screen appearance was in the 1972 movie Matamgi Manipur, the first full-length Manipuri feature film. Her role of widow in the movie Olangthagee Wangmadasoo is still vividly remembered by the cinema lovers of Manipur. In 1981, she went on to star in Imagi Ningthem (My Son, My Precious), which also became the first Indian film to win a Grand Prix Award. In the film, she portrayed the role of a step-mother. She also played supporting roles in digital films like Paokhum, Meera Memcha , Eidi Thamoi Pikhre and Eewai.

Filmography

External links

References

Indian film actresses
Living people
People from Imphal
Meitei people
1950 births
Actresses from Manipur
Actresses in Meitei cinema
20th-century Indian actresses
21st-century Indian actresses